Guan Bunima (官布尼玛, Pinyin: Guān Bù-ní-mǎ; born 2 October 1958) is a Chinese wrestler. He competed in the men's freestyle 57 kg at the 1984 Summer Olympics.

References

External links
 

1958 births
Living people
Chinese male sport wrestlers
Olympic wrestlers of China
Wrestlers at the 1984 Summer Olympics
Place of birth missing (living people)
20th-century Chinese people